Riddle (Shoshoni language: Yakwahnim Paa) is an unincorporated community in the southwestern part of the U.S. state of Idaho, in Owyhee County. The community lies at the north edge of the Duck Valley Indian Reservation.

The community has the name of the local Riddle family.

In 2000, the average median household income for the ZIP Code Tabulation Area that includes Grasmere and Riddle was $30,921.

Riddle was the fictional location for the beginning and end of the film Vanishing Point (1997 remake).

References

Unincorporated communities in Idaho
Unincorporated communities in Owyhee County, Idaho
Boise metropolitan area